Caroline Baron is a Golden Globe winning American film producer and philanthropist. She is best known for producing Mozart in the Jungle (2014), Capote (2005) and Monsoon Wedding (2001). Baron received an Academy Award nomination for producing Capote (2005) and is a member of the Academy of Motion Picture Arts and Sciences.

Caroline Baron founded FilmAid International in 1999, an organization dedicated to helping refugees and other communities around the world through the use of film.

Baron is an adjunct professor at NYU's Tisch School of the Arts in the undergraduate film program.

Film career
Caroline began her career as a production manager for the film The Toxic Avenger (1984). She was an associate producer on the television series The Wonder Years from 1988 to 1989.

Her producing work includes The Santa Clause (1994), Monsoon Wedding (2001), Capote (2005), Being Flynn (2012), Admission (2013), A Master Builder (2013), and the upcoming Amazon Studios original series Mozart in the Jungle.

Baron founded her production company named A-Line Pictures in 2005 with her husband, screenwriter and director, Anthony Weintraub.  A-Line was the co-production company for Capote (2005).

Yummico
Caroline Baron currently supervises production for the children's media company Yummico. She founded the company with creators Anthony Weintraub, Bob Mowen, and Traci Paige Johnson who is best known for creating the television series Blue's Clues.

FilmAid
After hearing about the 1999 Kosovo War Caroline Baron founded FilmAid International. The organization started by assisting refugees in Macedonia  through the use of educational films and entertainment.

“I learned very quickly that we could use the screens for more than entertainment,” Baron stated in a Vanity Fair article, “We could also communicate life-saving education. We were drawing huge crowds, and everyone wanted to see what was being projected.”

In 1999 Film Aid partnered with the United Nations High Commissioner for Refugees (UNHCR) and other global aid organizations to assist refugees in countries around the world including Guinea, Kenya, Afghanistan, Thailand, and Haiti.

Personal life
Baron lives in New York City with her husband Anthony Weintraub, and her two kids Asher and Emmanuel. Anthony Weintraub is a writer and director best known for writing the animated film adaptation of Tekkonkinkreet (2006). Caroline Baron's son Asher is the creator of the Menurkey, a menorah shaped like a turkey for Thanksgivukkah.

Filmography

|2018
| Film
| Bel Canto (film)
| Producer
|}
|-
||2019
| TV Series
| Katy Keene, Pilot
| Producer
|}
|-
|2020
| TV Series
| Katy Keene, Season One
| Producer
|}
|-
|2020
| TV Series
| Lisey's Story
| Co-Executive Producer

Awards and nominations

References

External links

A Line Pictures
Yummico
FilmAid

Living people
American film producers
Year of birth missing (living people)
Tisch School of the Arts faculty
Businesspeople from New York City